Česká rafinérská a.s. was the largest Czech oil refining company and the largest producer of oil products in the country. It was shared company of the Unipetrol, ENI and Shell (originally included one more owner, Conaco Philips). After the privatization of the Unipetrol (sold to the ORLEN Group), Shell and Conaco sold their portions and subsequently the ENI as well, finally  Unipetrol was the sole owner of this company.

See also

 Energy in the Czech Republic

References 

Oil and gas companies of the Czech Republic
Energy companies established in 1995